Chrysops niger, the black deer fly, is a fly of about  length, with a mostly black body with some white hairs, and having wings which are barred with black. They are active from May to September around areas of marsh in much of the United States.

The larvae of the black deer fly feed upon organic matter in damp soil, and are termed hydrobionts in that they inhabit areas of high water content.

References

Tabanidae
Insects described in 1838
Insects of the United States
Taxa named by Pierre-Justin-Marie Macquart